The Battle of Ephesus took place on 24 December 1147, during the Second Crusade. The French crusader army, led by Louis VII of France, successfully fended off an ambush by the Seljuks of Rum just outside the town of Ephesus.

Background
King Louis VII led the French army on the march across Europe and Asia Minor to Jerusalem. The army decided to march along the coast of Asia Minor, because the defeat of Emperor Conrad of Germany and his army at Dorylaeum had made it clear that marching inland was too dangerous. In early December 1147 the army stopped to rest at the ancient town of Ephesus before continuing through the Meander Valley to reach the major port of Adalia.  Upon arrival at Ephesus, Louis was warned by messengers of the Byzantine Emperor Manuel, that the surrounding area was overrun by Seljuk Turks and that it would be wiser for Louis to garrison his army in the Imperial strongholds for the time being, especially considering that he could not rely on the local Greek population for intelligence or military help. Louis refused to listen to this advice and led his troops out of Ephesus at the end of the month.

Battle
The Turks ambushed the Crusaders in the Decervium Valley, just outside Ephesus, as they were resting. Details of the battle are scarce, but according to the witness Odo of Deuil, the courage of the crusaders prevented the Turks from achieving success. Odo also claimed that the Muslim force was led by Greeks.

Aftermath
The Battle of Ephesus was a minor battle of the Second Crusade. William of Tyre, who says that the army rested at Ephesus, does not even mention that there was a battle there. The Turks continued to attack, and were able to inflict a devastating defeat on the Crusader army at Mount Cadmus in January 1148.

References

Bibliography

Primary Sources
Odo of Deuil, De profectione Ludovici VII in Orientem, trans. V.G. Berry (New York: W.W. Norton and Co., 1948).
William of Tyre, A History of Deeds Done Beyond the Sea, trans. E.A. Babcock and A.C. Krey (Columbia University Press, 1943).

Secondary Sources
Jonathan Phillips, The Second Crusade: Extending the frontiers of Christendom, (Yale University Press, 2007).
Christopher Tyerman, God's War: A New History of the Crusades, (Penguin, 2006).

Ephesus 1147
Ephesus 1147
Ephesus
History of İzmir Province
1147 in Asia
Ephesus 1147
1140s in the Byzantine Empire